Trier-Land is a Verbandsgemeinde ("collective municipality") in the Trier-Saarburg district, in Rhineland-Palatinate, Germany. It is situated on the border with Luxembourg, north and west of Trier. The seat of the municipality is in Trier, itself not part of the municipality.

The Verbandsgemeinde Trier-Land consists of the following Ortsgemeinden ("local municipalities"):

Aach 
Franzenheim 
Hockweiler 
Igel 
Kordel 
Langsur 
Newel 
Ralingen 
Trierweiler 
Welschbillig 
Zemmer

International relations

Trier-Land is twinned with:
 Podolsk, Russia

References

Verbandsgemeinde in Rhineland-Palatinate